Winny Oktavina Kandow (born 14 October 1998) is an Indonesian badminton player specializes in doubles from Tewasen village in South Minahasa (then of Minahasa), North Sulawesi.

Career 
Trained at the Tangkas Intiland Jakarta, she managed to claim the 2016 junior national mixed doubles title partnered with Yeremia Rambitan, and led her to join national team in 2017. Kandow entered the 2017 National Championships held in Pangkal Pinang with Akbar Bintang Cahyono, and the duo seized the national mixed doubles title after competing as a unseeded player. She is increasingly known after reaching the 2018 Singapore Open semifinal stage with Cahyono, but was defeated by their senior teammates Tontowi Ahmad and Liliyana Natsir in a tight straight games. She succeed in clinching her first international title by winning the 2018 Hyderabad Open.

2023 
In January, Kandow and her partner Amri Syahnawi competed at the Thailand Masters, but had to lose in the quarter-finals from 5th seed Korean pair Seo Seung-jae and Chae Yoo-jung.

Achievements

BWF World Tour (1 title) 
The BWF World Tour, which was announced on 19 March 2017 and implemented in 2018, is a series of elite badminton tournaments sanctioned by the Badminton World Federation (BWF). The BWF World Tours are divided into levels of World Tour Finals, Super 1000, Super 750, Super 500, Super 300 (part of the HSBC World Tour), and the BWF Tour Super 100.

Mixed doubles

BWF International Challenge/Series (3 titles, 2 runners-up) 
Mixed doubles

  BWF International Challenge tournament
  BWF International Series tournament
  BWF Future Series tournament

Performance timeline

Indonesian team 
 Senior level

Individual competitions

Senior level

Women's doubles

Mixed doubles

References

External links 
 

Living people
1998 births
Minahasa people
People from South Minahasa Regency
Sportspeople from North Sulawesi
Indonesian female badminton players
20th-century Indonesian women
21st-century Indonesian women